Omar Saif Ghobash (born June 4, 1971) is an Emirati diplomat and author. He was appointed Ambassador of the United Arab Emirates to France on November 24, 2017, having previously served as UAE Ambassador to Russia from 2009-2017. Ghobash authored the book, Letters to a Young Muslim (January 2017), which was written as a series of letters to his eldest son about what it means to be Muslim in the 21st century.

Education
Between the years 1986—1989, Ghobash was educated at Rugby School, a boarding independent school for boys in the market town of Rugby in Warwickshire, followed between 1989—1992 at Balliol College at the University of Oxford, where he gained a B.A. in Law. Between 2003—2007, he studied BSc. in Pure and Applied Mathematics, in an external programme at the University of London.

Life and career
Ghobash sponsors the Saif Ghobash Banipal Prize for Arabic Literary Translation, in memory of his father, Saif Ghobash, the UAE's first Minister of State for Foreign Affairs, who was assassinated at Abu Dhabi International Airport in 1977. Likewise, he is a founding trustee of the International Prize for Arabic Fiction which runs with the support of the Booker Prize Foundation in London. He founded one of the region's first contemporary art galleries, The Third Line, which is based in Dubai as well as The Arab Fund for Arts and Culture which supports and identifies the production, research, and distribution channels of contemporary Arab art and culture.

Ghobash is on the advisory body of The International Centre for the Study of Radicalisation and Political Violence at King's College London and the Emirates Diplomatic Academy in Abu Dhabi.

Prior to his appointment as Ambassador, the UAE did not have a diplomatic mission in Moscow for many years. More recently, however, the UAE has invested roughly $6 billion USD in Russia's infrastructure. Ghobash believes Russia's participation in fighting extremism is integral to creating stability in the region. A delegation from Abu Dhabi led by the Minister of Foreign Affairs, Sheikh Abdullah bin Zayed Al Nahyan, has bolstered its presence at The Kremlin in 2015 to coproduce solutions to counter terrorism and conflicts in the Middle East.

He is considered by many to be a thought leader on moderate Islam and the future of the Arab world, often calling for change through technological innovation and education in Arab countries. Regarding extremism in young Muslims, he said, “The key challenge for us is to stop treating our youth with distance, because there are recruiters out there making sure to grab those youth from us.”

After receiving funding from the government of Abu Dhabi, Ghobash was involved in 2008 in discussions with John Sexton on the opening of a campus of New York University in Abu Dhabi in 2010.

Ghobash is an avid hiker, once spending five years climbing the mountains of Nepal and Switzerland. He speaks Arabic, English, Russian, French, Italian and Spanish.

Bibliography

References

External links 
 

1971 births
Living people
Ambassadors of the United Arab Emirates to Russia
Alumni of the University of London
Alumni of Balliol College, Oxford
Emirati diplomats
Emirati businesspeople
Ambassadors of the United Arab Emirates to France
Emirati expatriates in the United Kingdom